Martholme Viaduct is a 19th-century railway viaduct in the English county of Lancashire. It lies between the town of Great Harwood and the village of Read, and lies in both the district of Hyndburn and that of Ribble Valley. The viaduct was constructed 1870–77 by engineer Sturges Meek. It was built to carry the Great Harwood Loop of the East Lancashire Line over the River Calder. That part of the line closed in 1957.

The viaduct was originally intended to be a wooden construction, but was eventually built of sandstone rubble. In 1984 it was designated as a Grade II listed structure by the organisation then-known as English Heritage.

See also

Listed buildings in Great Harwood
Listed buildings in Read, Lancashire
List of railway bridges and viaducts in the United Kingdom

References
Footnotes

Bibliography

External links

Bridges completed in 1877
Buildings and structures in Hyndburn
Buildings and structures in Ribble Valley
Grade II listed buildings in Lancashire
Great Harwood
Stone bridges in England
Railway viaducts in Lancashire
1877 establishments in England